Acraea lyci is a butterfly in the family Nymphalidae. It is found in Tanzania.

Taxonomy
See Pierre & Bernaud, 2014

References

Butterflies described in 2006
lyci
Endemic fauna of Tanzania
Butterflies of Africa